The Colony and Protectorate of Kenya competed at the 1960 Summer Olympics in Rome, Italy. 27 competitors, all men, took part in 13 events in 4 sports.

Athletics

Key
Note–Ranks given for track events are within the athlete's heat only
Q = Qualified for the next round
q = Qualified for the next round as a fastest loser or, in field events, by position without achieving the qualifying target
N/A = Round not applicable for the event
Bye = Athlete not required to compete in round

Men
Track & road events

Hockey

Roster

 Saude George
 Anthony Vaz
 Avtar Singh Sohal
 Nil Jagnandan Singh
 Surjeet Singh Deol
 Silvester Fernandes
 Edgar Fernandes
 Hilary Fernandes
 Surjeet Singh Panesar
 Pritam Singh Sandhu
 Alu Mendonca
 John Simonian
 Kirpal Singh Bhardwaj
 Gursaran Singh Sehmi
 Egbert Fernandes
 Krishnan Kumar Aggarwal

Preliminary round

Group C

Group standings

Play-offs

Quarter-final

Winning goal scored in sixth period of extra time.

Classification matches

Fifth to eighth place

The match was suspended due to darkness after 40 minutes of extra time, ending in a 1–1 draw; Australia was initially awarded the match by a coin toss, but after an appeal by Kenya, the match was declared a draw and a replay was ordered.

Due to unforeseen circumstances, Germany was unable to play in the match against Kenya, so the match was scratched and both teams were awarded seventh place.

Sailing

Three Kenyan sailors competed in two different disciplines in the Olympic Regatta in Naples.

Shooting

Three shooters represented Kenya in 1960.

References

External links
Official Olympic Reports

Nations at the 1960 Summer Olympics
1960
1960 in Kenyan sport
1960 Summer Olympics